The History of The Dave Clark Five is a compilation album by The Dave Clark Five, released in 1993. Released at the same time as its UK counterpart Glad All Over Again, it features a different track listing. It spent a week on the Billboard charts in August 1993 at #127.

All of the DC5's Top 40 hits are featured (with the exception of "You Must Have Been a Beautiful Baby") as well as classic album tracks, non-LP tracks and UK-only releases.

Track listing

CD one
"Glad All Over"
"Bits and Pieces"
"Do You Love Me"
"Can't You See That She's Mine"
"Because"
"Don't Let Me Down"
"Any Way You Want It"
"Everybody Knows (I Still Love You)"
"Anytime You Want Love"
"Thinking of You Baby"
"Whenever You're Around"
"Little Bitty Pretty One"
"Crying Over You"
"Don't Be Taken In"
"When"
"Reelin' and Rockin'"
"Come Home"
"Mighty Good Loving"
"Hurting Inside"
"Having a Wild Weekend"
"Till the Right One Comes Along" (Edited with instrumental break removed)
"Catch Us If You Can"
"I'll Be Yours (My Love)"
"I Am on My Own"
"I Need Love

CD two
"Try Too Hard"
"All Night Long"
"Look Before You Leap"
"Please Tell Me Why"
"Somebody Find a New Love" (Edited with bass intro removed)
"Satisfied with You"
"At the Scene"
"I Miss You"
"Do You Still Love Me"
"Nineteen Days"
"I've Got to Have a Reason"
"I Like It Like That"
"Over and Over"
"You Got What It Takes"
"Doctor Rhythm"
"Small Talk"
"Concentration Baby" (Single version)
"Everybody Knows"
"Inside and Out"
"At the Place"
"Best Day's Work"
"Maze of Love"
"Here Comes Summer"
"Live in the Sky"
"Everybody Get Together"

Personnel
Dave Clark - drums, backing vocals
Mike Smith - keyboards, lead vocals (except as indicated below)
Lenny Davidson - guitars, backing vocals, lead vocals on "I Am on My Own" and "Everybody Knows" (1967 version)
Rick Huxley - bass guitar, backing vocals
Denis Payton - saxophone, harmonica, lead vocals on "I Miss You"

1993 compilation albums
The Dave Clark Five albums
Hollywood Records compilation albums